Jorodd Asphjell (born 17 July 1960 in Orkdal) is a Norwegian politician for the Labour Party.

He was elected to the Norwegian Parliament from Sør-Trøndelag in 2005.

On the local level, he was a member of Orkdal municipal council from 1983 to 1987, later serving as deputy mayor from 1999 to 2003. He chairs the local party chapter since 2003.

He worked at a printing press from 1977 to 1994, and was county secretary of his party from 1997 to 2005. He has also been a board member of local sports clubs and organizations. He hails from Fannrem.

References

1960 births
Living people
Labour Party (Norway) politicians
Members of the Storting
Sør-Trøndelag politicians
21st-century Norwegian politicians